The National Examiner is a supermarket tabloid from America. It was formerly owned by American Media, Inc. (AMI). AMI's chief content officer, Dylan Howard, oversaw the publication.

The Examiner has the fewest pages, which was the least expensive tabloid in American Media's portfolio; it aims for an older audience. While its sister publications focus on more current content (such as the National Enquirer's focus on celebrity news and Globe's political and culture stories), the Examiner focuses on longer-standing stories featuring older (sometimes deceased) celebrities. Also prominently featured among the Examiner's stories are articles on daytime television.

National Examiner was owned by the Globe Communications until 1999, when American Media acquired it and its sister publication Globe. The magazine was based in Boca Raton, Florida, until September 10, 2015, when it moved to New York City.

Like other tabloids, its contents have often come under question, and it has been derided for its sensationalistic writing.

There is no website for the Examiner.

On April 18, 2019, AMI agreed to sell the Examiner, along with the National Enquirer and Globe, to Hudson Group.

In February 2023, A360media agreed to sell the National Enquirer to VVIP Ventures, a joint venture of the digital media company Vinco Ventures and a new company set up for the purchase, Icon Publishing.

References

Weekly magazines published in the United States
Magazines with year of establishment missing
Magazines published in Florida
Magazines published in New York City
Supermarket tabloids